Henyey is a lunar impact crater that lies on the far side of the Moon from the Earth. It is attached at the southern end to the northern rim of the crater Dirichlet. Less than a crater diameter to the northeast is the large crater Mach, and to the northwest lies Mitra.

This is a worn and eroded crater that has been partly disintegrated by subsequent impacts. The elongated crater Henyey U is attached to the western outer rim. The western interior floor of Henyey is disrupted by some small craters.

Henyey lies on the eastern margin of the Dirichlet-Jackson Basin.

Satellite craters 

By convention these features are identified on lunar maps by placing the letter on the side of the crater midpoint that is closest to Henyey.

See also 
 1365 Henyey, minor planet

References 

 
 
 
 
 
 
 
 
 
 
 
 

Impact craters on the Moon